Robert Lloyd Smith (January 8, 1861 – July 10, 1942) was an educator, businessman, and Republican politician who served two terms in the Texas Legislature. Born a free black in Charleston, South Carolina in 1861, he moved to Texas about 1880. He served as principal of the Oakland Normal School in Colorado County in 1885. In 1890 he founded the Farmer's Home Improvement Society, a farmer's cooperative association whose purpose was to help poor blacks lift themselves out of poverty. He was first elected to the legislature in 1895 and served until 1899. He was the last African-American to serve in the Texas State Legislature until Barbara Jordan's election in the 1960s. He was a delegate to the Republican National Convention in 1896. In 1902, he was appointed by President Theodore Roosevelt as Deputy U.S. Marshal for the Eastern District of Texas. He was an associate of Booker T. Washington and also served as a trustee of the Jeanes Foundation. He was married to Ruby Cobb and had two adopted children. He is depicted at the lower left on the Black Legislators Monument erected in 2010 at the Texas State Cemetery.

See also
African-American officeholders during and following the Reconstruction era

References
Texas Legislators: Past & Present - Robert L. Smith

Forever Free: Nineteenth Century African-American Legislators and Constitutional Convention Delegates of Texas
Findagrave - Robert Lloyd Smith
Texas State Cemetery - Monuments

Republican Party members of the Texas House of Representatives
1861 births
1942 deaths
Politicians from Charleston, South Carolina
Businesspeople from Charleston, South Carolina
African-American politicians during the Reconstruction Era
20th-century African-American people